Ashwood is an unincorporated community in Bath County, Virginia, United States.  It was the birthplace of golfer Sam Snead.

References

Unincorporated communities in Bath County, Virginia
Unincorporated communities in Virginia